Marco Donadel  (born 21 April 1983) is an Italian football coach and a former midfielder, currently working as assistant coach of the Russian club Spartak Moscow.

Club career

Milan
Donadel is a youth product of Milan, playing for the youth side between 1998 and 2002, winning the Torneo di Viareggio in 1999 and 2001, before being promoted to the senior side. On 4 March 2001, he made his debut for Milan, coming on as a substitute for Andres Guglielminpietro at the 78th minute of a home Serie A game against Parma. The following season, he made his debut appearances in the UEFA Cup and Coppa Italia.

Having made just 4 appearances for the senior squad of Milan, Donadel was loaned out to Lecce in July 2002.

In June 2003 Donadel was sold to Parma in a co-ownership deal for €2 million. (with 50% rights of Roberto Massaro was purchased by Milan for €2 million) The deal made Milan making a profit of €3.897 million. In June 2004 Milan bought back 50% rights of Donadel for €800,000 in a four-year contract (Milan booked the contract value of Donadel was €4 million instead of €1.6 million, thus receiving €1.2 million financial income instead of costing Milan to write down the value of retaining 50% registration rights for €1.2 million.) In 2004–05 season Donadel was loaned to Sampdoria for free and finally Fiorentina in January 2005, for €200,000.

Fiorentina
After a successful half-season long loan with Fiorentina, he was signed on a permanent basis for €1.2 million in a four-year contract. The deal also made Milan book a €1.8 million loss. as the residual value of Donadel's contract, after amortization, was €3 million. In 2005–06 he was a regular for coach Cesare Prandelli, who had already appreciated the skills of Donadel, as they were together at Parma. In June 2007, he was offered a new contract which would last until June 2011.

Napoli
On 24 June 2011, he signed a four-year contract with Napoli. During his stay with Napoli he only appeared in four league matches and during the 2013–14 season he was sent on loan to Verona where he was a regular starter for the club.

Montreal Impact
Once his loan spell with Verona concluded Donadel went on trial with Major League Soccer side Montreal Impact. Donadel officially signed with the Montreal Impact on 1 December 2014. His 30-yard strike in a 3–0 home win against Columbus Crew, on 11 July 2015, was voted MLS goal of the week for the 19th week of the 2015 MLS season. On 25 October, he assisted one of Drogba's goals as the Montreal Impact came from behind to defeat domestic rivals Toronto FC 2–1 at home; the win gave Montreal the home advantage for their knock-out fixture against Toronto in the 2015 MLS Cup Playoffs.

Donadel was waived by Montreal on 22 June 2018.

International career
Donadel was the captain of Italy under-21 team between 2004 and 2006, and won the 2004 European Under-21 Football Championship, totalling 31 appearances and 1 goal. Donadel also won a bronze medal with Italy at the 2004 Summer Olympics football tournament.

Coaching career
On 17 December 2021, Donadel was announced as the new assistant coach of Spartak Moscow, following the appointment of Paolo Vanoli as the club's new head coach.

Honours

Club
Napoli
Coppa Italia: 2011–12

Montreal Impact
CONCACAF Champions League: 2014–15 (Runner-up)

International
Italy U21
Olympic Bronze Medal: 2004
UEFA European Under-21 Championship: 2004

Orders
 5th Class / Knight: Cavaliere Ordine al Merito della Repubblica Italiana: 2004

References

External links
 
 stats. at Voetbal International 
 National Team stats. at FIGC official site  
 
 

1983 births
Living people
People from Conegliano
Association football midfielders
Italian footballers
Italian expatriate footballers
Italy youth international footballers
Italy under-21 international footballers
Olympic footballers of Italy
A.C. Milan players
U.S. Lecce players
Parma Calcio 1913 players
U.C. Sampdoria players
ACF Fiorentina players
S.S.C. Napoli players
Hellas Verona F.C. players
CF Montréal players
Serie A players
Serie B players
Major League Soccer players
Footballers at the 2004 Summer Olympics
Olympic bronze medalists for Italy
Olympic medalists in football
Expatriate soccer players in Canada
Medalists at the 2004 Summer Olympics
Knights of the Order of Merit of the Italian Republic
Italian football managers
Italian expatriate football managers
Expatriate football managers in Russia
Italian expatriate sportspeople in Canada
Italian expatriate sportspeople in Russia
Sportspeople from the Province of Treviso
Footballers from Veneto